Asthenotricha polydora is a moth in the family Geometridae first described by Hubert Robert Debauche in 1938. It is found in the Democratic Republic of the Congo, Rwanda and Uganda.

References

Moths described in 1938
Asthenotricha
Insects of the Democratic Republic of the Congo
Moths of Africa